Federal News Agency or FENA ( -  - ФЕНА) is the government-owned national news agency of the Federation of Bosnia and Herzegovina.

History
It was established in 2000 by a Decree of the Government of the Federation of Bosnia and Herzegovina for the purpose of performing news and agency activities of importance to the FBiH. 

The FENA news agency was created by merging the former entity-owned agencies BH Press Sarajevo and Habena Mostar. The head office is based in Sarajevo (Ćemaluša 1, 71 000 Sarajevo  and Obala Kulina bana 16, 71 000 Sarajevo) and in Mostar (Ante Starčevića bb, 88 000 Mostar).

Every day, FENA publishes an average of about 250 news items in the official languages of Bosnia and Herzegovina (BHS) and English, and in addition to general and specialist news services, it publishes an increasing number of photo and video content.

According to the media reports, FENA's correspondent network is spread throughout Bosnia and Herzegovina, because they have taken their role in the media sector seriously and publish news from all over the country on a daily basis.

FENA Offices
FENA correspondent offices in Bosnia and Herzegovina:
 Sarajevo
 Mostar
 Tuzla 
 Brčko (planned) 
 Bihać (planned) 
 Banja Luka (planned) 

In addition to the FENA news agency, in Bosnia and Herzegovina also operate: 
 SRNA - entity level news agency of Republika Srpska
 KTA BK BiH - Catholic news agency of the Bishops' Conference of Bosnia and Herzegovina by Bishops' Conference of BiH
 MINA News Agency - Muslim informative news agency by Islamic Community of Bosnia and Herzegovina
 ONASA - Independent news agency from Sarajevo - ONASA
 Agencija Anadolija - sister company of Anadolu Agency for Bosnia and Herzegovina

Associations
Since 22 September 2017, FENA news agency is first and full member of European Alliance of News Agencies. from Bosnia and Herzegovina.

Also, FENA news agency is member of non-profit professional association ABNA-SE, regional association of the news agencies of South East European countries (Bosnia and Herzegovina, Croatia, Serbia, Macedonia, Albania, Kosovo, Bulgaria, Romania, Turkey, Greece and Cyprus).

FENA Services
The news services are available in Bosnian, Croatian and English language.

  Vijesti (News) - general news service
 Najave događaja (Event announcements) - schedules of daily events in BiH 
 Stranačke aktivnosti (Activities of political parties) - review of statements and notices from political parties 
 FENA.BIZ (Business/economic service) - the largest overview of economic events in the Bosnia and Herzegovina, PR company announcements, information from the Sarajevo Stock Exchange and Banja Luka Stock Exchange 
 Servisne informacije (Service information) - traffic and weather services
  Foto servis (Photo service) - recordings of photos for newspapers and web portals 
  Video servis (Video service) - recording statements for TV and web portals 
 FENA LIVE - a new service through which FENA will inform its customers, as well as the general public in Bosnia and Herzegovina and the world about the most important events, by broadcasting live video signals.
  News in English - news summary in English

See also
 BHRT
 Television in Bosnia and Herzegovina
 List of radio stations in Bosnia and Herzegovina
 Media of Bosnia and Herzegovina

References

External links 
 www.fena.news
 www.fena.ba
 www.newsalliance.org

News agencies based in Bosnia and Herzegovina
Companies established in 2000
Companies based in Sarajevo
Mass media in Sarajevo
Government-owned companies of Bosnia and Herzegovina
2000 establishments in Bosnia and Herzegovina
News media in Bosnia and Herzegovina

Mass media in Mostar